The 2008 UCI Mountain Bike World Cup included four disciplines: cross-country, downhill, marathon and four-cross. It was sponsored by Nissan.

Cross-country

Downhill

Marathon

Four-Cross

See also
2008 UCI Mountain Bike & Trials World Championships

UCI Mountain Bike World Cup
Mountain Bike World Cup